Vidonci is a village in the Municipality of Grad in the Prekmurje region of northeastern Slovenia.

There is a small chapel in the settlement dedicated to the Sacred Heart of Jesus. It was built in 1888.

References

External links
Vidonci on Geopedia

Populated places in the Municipality of Grad